Cirsium acaule or acaulon has the English name dwarf thistle or stemless thistle.  It is widespread across much of Europe. It is often found on short, calcerous grasslands.

Description
Cirsium acaule is a perennial herb.  The leaves are a spreading rosette, spiny, 10 to 15 cm long.

There is usually only one flower head, although there can sometimes be 2 or 3.  Usually it is not stalked from the leaf rosette.  The flower head is 3 to 4 cm long, the florets are red/purple.  They flower from June to September.

References

acaule
Flora of Europe
Plants described in 1753
Taxa named by Carl Linnaeus